Houston Gaines (born January 11, 1995) is an American politician from Georgia. Gaines is a Republican member of the Georgia House of Representatives from the 117th district since 2019.

Early life 
On January 11, 1995, Gaines was born in Athens, Georgia. Gaines' grandfather is the late Judge Joseph Gaines.

Education 
In 2017, Gaines earned a Bachelor of Arts degree in Political Science and Economics from University of Georgia's University of Georgia School of Public and International Affairs and University of Georgia's Terry College of Business. In 2016, Gaines served as the Student Government Association president, until 2017.

Career 
On November 6, 2018, Gaines won the election and became a Republican member of Georgia House of Representatives for District 117. Gaines defeated Deborah Gonzalez with 53.55% of the votes. On November 3, 2020, as an incumbent, Gaines won the election and continued serving District 117. Gaines defeated Mokah Jasmine Johnson with 56.58% of the votes.

Awards 
 2019 Champion of Recovery. Named by Georgia Council on Substance Abuse.
 2020 UGA 40 Under 40. Named by University of Georgia School of Public and International Affairs.

References

External links 
 Houston Gaines at ballotpedia.org
 Exclusive Interview: Houston Gaines (December 28, 2018)

1995 births
21st-century American politicians
Living people
Republican Party members of the Georgia House of Representatives
Politicians from Athens, Georgia